In stochastic game theory, Bayesian regret is the expected difference ("regret") between the utility of a Bayesian strategy and that of the optimal strategy (the one with the highest expected payoff). 

The term Bayesian refers to Thomas Bayes (1702–1761), who proved a special case of what is now called Bayes' theorem, who provided the first mathematical treatment of a non-trivial problem of statistical data analysis using what is now known as Bayesian inference.

Economics
This term has been used to compare a random buy-and-hold strategy to professional traders' records. This same concept has  received numerous different names, as the New York Times notes: 

"In 1957, for example, a statistician named James Hanna called his theorem Bayesian Regret. He had been preceded by David Blackwell, also a statistician, who called his theorem Controlled Random Walks. Other, later papers had titles like 'On Pseudo Games', 'How to Play an Unknown Game', 'Universal Coding' and 'Universal Portfolios'".

Social Choice (voting methods)

"Bayesian Regret" has also been used as an alternate term for social utility efficiency, that is, a measure of the expected utility of different voting methods under a given probabilistic model of voter utilities and strategies. In this case, the relation to Bayes is unclear, as there is no conditioning or posterior distribution involved.

References

Game theory
Bayesian estimation
Economic theories
Machine learning
Bayesian statistics
Social choice theory